A fist is a hand with fingers curled into the palm and thumb retracted, displaying the knuckles.

Fist or FIST may also refer to:

 Fist (typography), the symbol ☞

In arts and entertainment
 F.I.S.T. (film), a 1978 film (Federation of Interstate Truckers)
F.I.S.T.: Forged In Shadow Torch, a 2021 Metroidvania video game
Fist (band), a heavy metal band from the UK
Fantasy Interactive Scenarios by Telephone, a series of single-player telephone-based roleplaying games
 Reverend Jeff "Fist" Fistwick, a recurring character in the TV series Ideal
Monument to Joe Louis, also known as "The Fist", a 1986 public art sculpture in Detroit, Michigan

In military use
 Forward observers in the U.S. military or Fire Support Teams (FIST), military artillery observers responsible for directing fire
 Future Integrated Soldier Technology, a project by the British Army to enhance infantry combat effectiveness

Other uses
 Free Image Search Tool, a Wikimedia tool to search for free images to add to Wikipedia articles
 Fugitive Investigative Strike Team, a series of operations to capture violent fugitives between 1981 and 1986
 Fist, a telegraph key operator's identifiable style
 FiST, a common abbreviation for the Ford Fiesta ST

See also
 Fisting, a sexual activity
 Fist bump, a gesture similar in meaning to a handshake or high five
 Fist pump, a celebratory gesture
 Raised fist, a salute used by political and social activists